Harold Gordon may refer to:

Harold Gordon (actor), see Viva Zapata!
Harold Gordon (biologist), see RNA Tie Club
Harold Gordon (baseball), see 1957 Caribbean Series

See also
Harry Gordon (disambiguation)